Rilus Doolittle (April 15, 1900 – February 11, 1983) was an American long-distance runner. He competed in the men's 5000 metres at the 1924 Summer Olympics.

References

External links
 

1900 births
1983 deaths
Athletes (track and field) at the 1924 Summer Olympics
American male long-distance runners
Olympic track and field athletes of the United States
Place of birth missing
20th-century American people